This is the list of the number-one albums of the UK Indie Breakers Chart during the 2010s.

Number-one albums

By artist

Twenty five artists have spent three or more weeks at the top of the chart during the 2010s. The totals below include only credited performances.

By record label
Thirty seven record labels have spent four or more weeks at the top of the chart during the 2010s.

See also
 Lists of UK Independent Albums Chart number ones

References

External links
Independent Albums Breakers at the Official Charts Company

2010s in British music
United Kingdom Independent Albums
Indie Breakers